Frederick Strothmann (1872–1958) was an American illustrator of magazines and books. He also drew political cartoons and 
posters.

Early life
Strothmann was born in New York City in 1872, although some sources say in Philadelphia in 1879. Little is known about his early life, except that his parents were migrants to the United States from Germany. He studied art at the Carl Hecker School of Art in New York, the Royal Academy in Berlin and in Paris.

Career
By 1900, Strothmann was established as an illustrator, working for The Saturday Evening Post, Collier's, Life, Harper's Magazine, and Good Housekeeping. He also illustrated many books.

Strothmann created a well-known poster for the Liberty Bond drive of 1918, "Beat back the Hun with Liberty Bonds", showing a German soldier with blood on his hands, holding a bayonet and coming over the Atlantic Ocean towards burning ruins, which became an iconic image of the First World War.

Strothmann and his family were living in Manhattan at the time of the censuses of 1910, 1920, 1930 and 1940, and he ended his life living in Flushing, Queens, where he died in 1958.

An obituary noted that Strothmann had continued to work as an illustrator until two years before his death

Books illustrated
Mark Twain, The Celebrated Jumping Frog of Calaveras County (1903)
 Mark Twain, Extracts from Adam's Diary (1904)
Harry Graham, Misrepresentative Men (1904)
 Mark Twain, Editorial Wild Oats (1905)
 Thornton W. Burgess, The Bride's Primer (1905)
Carolyn Wells, Rubaiyat of a Motor Car (1906)
Ellis Parker Butler, That Pup (1908)

Notes

1872 births
1958 deaths
American cartoonists